The Good Guys, Inc., was an American chain of consumer electronics retail stores with 71 stores in California, Nevada, Oregon, and Washington. The company was headquartered in Brisbane, California in the Dakin Building in the early 1990s and subsequently in Alameda, California until it was bought in late 2003 by CompUSA. The Good Guys was founded in 1973 by Ron Unkefer on Chestnut Street, San Francisco. By 2006, all of the company's stores had closed.

WOW! Stores
In 1995, The Good Guys teamed up with Tower Records to create one "WOW!" Store in Las Vegas, NV featuring a mixture of Tower and Good Guys inventory & a coffee shop, and included the world’s largest promotional slot machine.  Tower's founder Russell Solomon reportedly liked the end result and 
two more WOW! Multimedia Superstores were opened, one in Long Beach, CA, where Neil Diamond played at the grand opening and others opened in Laguna Hills, and San Mateo CA. By 2006, Tower was bankrupt and Good Guys was being consolidated into CompUSA and thus all of these stores closed.

Re-launch
After all The Good Guys stores closed, CompUSA began marketing all California and Hawaii stores as "CompUSA with The Good Guys Inside" in response to Best Buy's new marketing campaign "with Magnolia Inside". However, this marketing campaign was dropped in an attempt to further separate CompUSA from the Good Guys name, and assist in launching its new Home Entertainment sections in select locations. The Good Guys name once again ceased to exist in 2008 when CompUSA closed its remaining stores. Extended warranties on televisions purchased through The Good Guys or CompUSA can still be accessed through General Electric Extended Warranties.

Hostage crisis

In 1991, one of the stores in the chain located in Sacramento was taken over by four gunmen. This event became the largest hostage rescue operation on home soil in U.S. history to date, with about 50 hostages being held at gunpoint.

See also
The Good Guys (Australian company), a chain of electronics stores that are not associated with the American operations.

References

"Good Guys lose suit to block competition," The Sacramento Bee, December 2, 1987.
"Market Place; Electronics Chain On Roller Coaster," The New York Times, July 6, 1992.
"Good Guys bets that the customer is always right," San Jose Mercury News, November 23, 1992.
"Good Guys horror still vivid to ex-hostages 4 years later," The Sacramento Bee, April 3, 1995.
"Good Guys CEO Discloses Master Plan," San Francisco Chronicle, July 27, 1999.
"Good Guys Inc. will drop computers, office products," Seattle Post-Intelligencer, August 2, 1999.
"Good Guys to spin off web store," CNET, January 5, 2000.
"The Good Guys Laying Off 450 Employees", San Francisco Chronicle, March 2, 2001.
"CompUSA to purchase Good Guys: $58 million deal expected to benefit both companies", San Francisco Chronicle, September 30, 2003.
"Good Guys quarterly sales fall, sees wider loss," Forbes, June 10, 2003.
"Ex-Good Guys director settles SEC charges," MSNBC, April 26, 2005.
"Good Guys to close stores: Stand-alone outlets in California and Hawaii to get the ax," San Francisco Chronicle, October 6, 2005.
"Tower Records Welcome Video, 1999.," Specific Marker mentions WOW! Stores and how it was formed, this info was used in the WOW! Section.

External links

The Good Guys, Inc. History at FundingUniverse

Consumer electronics retailers in the United States
Defunct retail companies of the United States
Defunct consumer electronics retailers in the United States
Retail companies based in California
Companies based in San Mateo County, California
Brisbane, California
Retail companies established in 1973
Retail companies disestablished in 2005
1973 establishments in California
2005 disestablishments in California
Defunct companies based in the San Francisco Bay Area